Pavel Fomenko (born 29 June 1976) is a Russian high jumper.

He finished ninth at the 2002 European Indoor Championships, twelfth at the 2002 European Championships, and won the bronze medal at the 2005 European Indoor Championships.

References

1976 births
Living people
Russian male high jumpers